The 2013 season is the Harrisburg City Islanders's 10th season of competitive soccer - its tenth season in the third division of American soccer and its third season in USL Pro since the league was first created with the City Islanders as one of the original 10 founder-members.

Season overview 

In the end of season all-league teams, three players from the Islanders made the selections. Sainey Touray was the sole member from Harrisburg to make the first team, while goalkeeper Nick Noble and Lucky Mkosana - HCI's top scorer - were picked for the second team.

Roster 

Source

Transfers

In

Out

Competitions

USL Pro

League table

Results
All times in Eastern Time.

Results summary

Playoffs
The City Islanders were beaten in the quarterfinals of the 2013 USL Pro season playoffs by the Charlotte Eagles. The North Carolina club ran out 3–1 winners.

U.S. Open Cup 

The Harrisburg City Islanders were knocked out of the U.S. Open Cup at the second round stage by Reading United.

References 

Penn FC seasons
2013 USL Pro season
Harrisburg City Islanders